Roslindale Village station is an MBTA Commuter Rail station on the Needham Line, located in the Roslindale Square business district of the Roslindale neighborhood in Boston, Massachusetts. The station has a single side platform serving the line's single track, with a mini-high platform for accessibility.

History

Stations at South Street (later Roslindale, now Roslindale Village), Central, and  all opened with the branch.

A grade crossing elimination project in the late 1890s raised the tracks above grade. A rail bridge was built over Roberts Street, while South Street was cut at the tracks, with only a pedestrian underpass. The 1898-built bridge over Roberts Street was be replaced with a modern bridge in June 2021. The new bridge was designed to allow construction of a parallel span should a second track be later added.

Bus connections

Roslindale Square is an important bus transfer location; nine MBTA bus routes run on Washington Street between Forest Hills and Roslindale, then fan out to the south and west. Five of these routes (plus the 14, which terminates at Roslindale Square) serve the station directly via Belgrade Avenue:
: Roslindale Square–
: – via Cummins Highway and Roslindale Square
: Dedham Mall or Stimson Street–Forest Hills station
: Millennium Park or VA Hospital–Forest Hills station
: Baker Street & Vermont Street–Forest Hills station
: Reservoir station–Forest Hills station

: Dedham Square–Forest Hills station
: Walpole Center–Forest Hills station
: Georgetowne–Forest Hills station
: Cleary Square–Forest Hills station

Route , a single early-morning trip, also serves Roslindale Square.

References

External links

MBTA - Roslindale Village
 Robert Street entrance from Google Maps Street View

MBTA Commuter Rail stations in Boston
Former New York, New Haven and Hartford Railroad stations
1850 establishments in Massachusetts

Railway stations in the United States opened in 1850